Carl Ludwig Kirmse (1888–1982) was a German art director who worked prolifically on films during the silent and sound eras.

Selected filmography
 The House of Torment (1921)
 Country Roads and the Big City (1921)
 The Fountain of Madness (1921)
 Lumpaci the Vagabond (1922)
 Your Valet (1922)
 The Hungarian Princess (1923)
 The Beautiful Girl (1923)
 To a Woman of Honour (1924)
 Fever for Heights (1924)
 Destiny (1925)
 Love's Finale (1925)
 The Searching Soul (1925)
 The Circus Princess (1925)
 My Friend the Chauffeur (1926)
 I Liked Kissing Women (1926)
 The Dashing Archduke (1927)
 The Harbour Baron (1928)
 Suzy Saxophone (1928)
 Rasputin (1928)
 Bookkeeper Kremke (1930)
 The Girl from the Marsh Croft (1935)
 The Monastery's Hunter (1935)
 The Girl of Last Night (1938)
 Twilight (1940)
The Master of the Estate (1943)
 The War of the Oxen (1943)
 Why Are You Lying, Elisabeth? (1944)
 The Murder Trial of Doctor Jordan (1949)
 Artists' Blood (1949)
 Where the Trains Go (1949)
 The Cloister of Martins (1951)
 When the Heath Dreams at Night (1952)
 Marriage Strike (1953)
 Hubertus Castle (1954)
 Silence in the Forest (1955)
 The Vulture Wally (1956)
 A Summer You Will Never Forget (1959)

References

Bibliography
 Giesen, Rolf. Nazi Propaganda Films: A History and Filmography. McFarland, 2003.

External links

1888 births
1982 deaths
German art directors